is a mountain on the border of Saitama, Yamanashi, and Nagano prefectures in Japan. The mountain is the source of the Arakawa and Shinano Rivers. It is one of the 100 Famous Japanese Mountains.

References

Kobushi
Kobushi
Kobushi